Catalano is an Italian surname, originally an adjective or derived substantive indicating something or someone Catalan or from Catalonia, can refer to the following persons:

Paul Anthony Catalano, birth name of American singer/songwriter Layto
Eduardo Catalano, Argentinian architect and sculptor 
Elisabetta Catalano,  Italian photographer 
Nick Catalano, American author
Patti Catalano, American long-distance runner
Tom Catalano, American record producer
Armando Catalano birth name of Guy Williams (actor)

Notes 

Italian-language surnames
Italian toponymic surnames
Ethnonymic surnames